Capricornia (1938) is the debut novel by Xavier Herbert.

Like his later work considered by many a masterpiece, the Miles Franklin Award-winning Poor Fellow My Country, it provides a fictional account of life in 'Capricornia', a place clearly modelled specifically on Australia's Northern Territory, and to a lesser degree on tropical Australia in general, (i.e. anywhere north of the Tropic of Capricorn) in the early twentieth century. It was written in London between 1930 and 1932.

Highly influenced by the Jindyworobak Movement, it also describes the inter-racial relationships and abuses of the period.

It was written before Herbert was acting Protector of the Aborigines in Darwin.

A few extracts

The book opens,

Although that northern part of the Continent of Australia which is called Capricornia was pioneered long after the southern parts, its unofficial early history was even more bloody than that of the others. One probable reason for this is that the pioneers had already had experience of subduing Aborigines in the South and hence were impatient of wasting time with people who they knew were determined to take no immigrants. Another reason is that the Aborigines were there more numerous than in the South and more hostile because used to resisting casual invaders from the near East Indies. A third reason is that the pioneers had difficulty in establishing permanent settlements, having several times to abandon ground they had won with slaughter and go slaughtering again to secure more. This abandoning of ground was due not to the hostility of the natives, hostile enough though they were, but to the violence of the climate, which was not to be withstood even by men so well equipped with lethal weapons and belief in the decency of their purpose as Anglo-Saxon builders of Empire.

The story, like other works by Herbert, is immense and rambling, following with irony the fortunes and otherwise, of a range of Outback Characters, over a span of generations. Through their story is reflected a story of Australia, concerning the clash of personalities and societies that provide the substance on which today's society is founded. Characters of particular interest include the unfortunate underdogs (many granted fewer rights in the officially White pre-1970s Australia) of whom Xavier is one of the few outstanding champions who demonstrates any real insight and compassion—though not by any favour, but simply by the fact that he places all on an equal standing. Perhaps the most notable characters in his story are those followed from birth. For example, Norman ("Nawnim", or "no-name"):

"What -- you raisin' a herd of yeller-fellers?" asked Chook.
Jock swallowed a mouthful of Ambrosia, gasped, blinked. "Gawd!" he breathed. "What's thaht -- kerosene?"
Chook frowned.
Mark grinned, and said, "Yeah -- you can have the kid if you want him, Jock. But don't go tellin' anyone where you got him. Dinkum, he's not mine --"
"Aw I wawn't say nawthin'," said Jock.
"Give's your word on it," said Mark. "And give's you word you'll treat him decent."
"Right!" said Jock, and grasped his hand. "There's me worrd. You can rely on me to bring him up like he wuz me awn soon, cos then I wawn't have to pay him wages -- see?"

And Constance:

Such was the man to whom came Constance the Javan Princess, exotic enough to spice desiring her with the barbarity of comboing [mixed-race intercourse, forbidden under law, thus always illicit], ordinary enough to save the spice from the suspicion of being poison. But it was not as a Princess that she came to him. She came as a distracted child leading a dying horse on which lay her limp dead father. As such Lace saw her first, and as such regarded her for some time to come, except in moments when without wishing it his eyes enjoyed her curves and sturdiness.

Herbert's frank historical settings give authenticity to much that would otherwise be forgotten, for instance:

On a side veranda he stopped to look into a lounge-bar at six officers from a Japanese cruise that lay in the harbour as the country's defence. They were drinking wine and playing dominoes, and were quite alone, because they were regarded by those they were defending as inferiors. Oscar was attracted by their child-like laughter and animation. While he watched, you Wally Shay, who worked as barman for his mother, thrust a head through the little serving window, and addressing the group collectively, said "How you gettin' along yous Charlies -- All-i?"
"Thank you very mush," replied all the Charlies, bowing."

In not dodging the unattractive, and actively seeking the non-conformist characters, he has preserved for modern readers a view which seems not unlike that of modern writers, where so much of early-to-mid 20th century history of Australia is bland, apoliticised, and ignores the vast majority of the truth, following the politic of the White Australia myth. Here, a paragraph about the return of a soldier following World War I, relating his stories to an older advocate of the war who stayed at home.

On the whole Frank rather disappointed Tim. It seemed as though he had fought most of his battles in the back lanes of Montmartre and Shoreditch against military police, as though the only captures he had made were among the Mademoiselles and Tarts, as though he had been more often "shot" than shot at. His talk of life in the zone of war dealt mainly with rats and lice and mud and evil sanitation and fun with comrades. And it seemed as though he had hated the French and British far more than he had the Hun. Tim was annoyed. He felt that a marvellous adventure had been wasted on a fool. Frank was also annoyed by this incessant questioning about a subject he wished to forget. The moment the priming gave out he told Tim to go to jiggery.

Occasionally the facts seem to need to be spoken plainly, and Herbert is not completely averse to rants by his characters, but these are few and far between. The following rant given with only minimal irony, on behalf of the Officer in Charge of the Native Compound seems worth reproducing, given that it mirrors closely many of the circumstances of the country of Australia 70 years later (remember Capricornia is a fictional nation, and some small discrepancies are likely, even without the gap of 70 years since the novel was written):

The fault of the state of the Compound rested on the entire Nation. At back of it was the mad pride in colour, and greed for petty exaltation, of the general public, the callousness of people who used the labour of the Aborigines, the stupidity and selfishness of both local and National Governments.
Why -- it cost more to pay the Resident Commissioner's salary than to feed and clothe and doctor all the thousands of blacks and halfcastes in the land! Not a word of exaggeration. And that gentleman's salary had recently been raised to meet the increased cost of living. Still only four pence per head per day was provided for the maintenance of the inmates of the Compound. In the bush the blacks were dying like flies of consumption and measles and leprosy and gonorrhoea for the sake of a few pounds' worth of facilities to treat them. Oh the paltriness! The foul neglect! But it was no fault of the Protecto's. He had striven with all his might to get the means, and still strove though the expenses allowed him were even reduced and he was constantly reprimanded for exceeding the Estimates. Poor unproductive stock he had! Why were they so? Because they were not allowed to be anything else. Were they to flourish and be incorporated into the life of the Nation the problem of miscegenation would become great. The prudes who ruled the Nation were afraid of that. To prevent it they would rather wipe out the Aborigines -- wipe out a race! That in a nutshell was the reason of the National Government's vast and almost incredible callosity. The man behind it was the President of the Commonwealth himself. How a man could sleep of nights with this monstrous thing on his soul -- God knows!
Consider the collosity of these parliamentary pigs. The Government could afford to buy a £10,000 shooner for the purpose of making a search for five white people supposed to have been marooned somewhere down the coast when the S.S. Rawlinson was lost, but not a sixpenny syringe for the Compound hospital, could afford to over-staff the Government Offices with men at a minimum salary of £8 a week, but not a few sheets of iron to repair the roofs of the hovels that lay there in view ... were so poor that they could not allow people who died in the Compound even a shroud of the ragged blanket in which they died, were so poor that they had to house the hundred-odd children of the Halfcastes' Home in a building of exactly similar proportions to that in which the matron of the institution lived alone. Oh the paltriness! Wasting money on useless Commissions to investigate the problems of settling the land, which the blacks and halfcastes would have settled in no time if trained to do it, while seventy thousand blacks and twenty thousand halfcastes lived like dogs. What a Nation! If it ever got anywhere in the world there was no God!

As for the administrators of the System of Government which offers such services, to Herbert, the vast majority are self-interested nincompoops, and the system reliably self-perpetuating due to a more-or-less indefinite supply of same, viz:

Dr Aintee held no high opinion of the great black and brindle family he fathered, nor viewed their plight with sentiment, not understanding their plight nor being expected to do so by his employer, the Government. Like his employer, he regarded them merely as marsupials being routed by a pack of dingoes; and he understood that his duty was merely to protect them from undue violence during the rout. Most of the dingoes hated him for interfering with their rights as the stronger animals; the marsupials regarded him as a sort of devil-devil, and trembled at mention of his name. Thus he was loved by few; but he was well enough paid to be careless of what was thought of him; his salary amounted to about a quarter of the total expenditure on Aboriginal Affairs in Capricornia.

Indeed, heroes are few, or non-existent. Acts of bravado usually tempt swift retribution from forces outside the control of the characters, force which is wielded with such offhand irony by the author that one eventually becomes inured to their pain, and able to predict to some extent when one has gotten above themself and about to fall. But it is this spite in the face of the inevitable, strength of conviction, courage, and blindness to consequence that Herbert apparently admires most—even the stupidest and most vain are given equal respect having served their role in elucidating the beautiful interweave of the pattern whose surface is all that is discovered by most other authors.

Recognition 
The book won the Australian Literature Society Gold Medal for Australia’s Best Novel of 1939.

Prominent Australian author and historian Geoffrey Dutton included Capricornia in The Australian Collection: Australia’s Greatest Books, describing it as “one of the most energetic of modern novels. And it is a modern novel, despite its straightforward narrative technique and style and being set in the past, with characters whose names recall Bunyan or Dickens. It is modern because it impinges on contemporary consciousness.”

Stage adaptation 
Playwright Louis Nowra adapted Capricornia for the stage, first performed by in 1988. Company B Belvoir's production, directed by Kingston Anderson, opened at Sydney's Belvoir St Theatre in April 1988 before a national tour. Belvoir revived Nowra's play in 2006 in a production directed by Wesley Enoch at the Seymour Centre in Sydney.

References

External links
xavier-herbert-novels-com contains 2 chapters on Capricornia. They can be read on the site or downloaded.

1938 Australian novels
Australian historical novels
Novels set in the Northern Territory
ALS Gold Medal winning works
Xavier Herbert
Plays by Louis Nowra
1988 plays
1938 debut novels